Kenny Lattimore is the debut solo album of American singer Kenny Lattimore. It was released on May 14, 1996 by Columbia Records. The set was bolstered by the success of singles "Never Too Busy," "Just What It Takes", "Always Remember", and "For You".

Critical reception 

Upon its release, critics hailed Kenny Lattimore as an album that hearkened back to the time of Donny Hathaway and Marvin Gaye when "R&B had more soul"

Chart performance 
The album reached a peak of number 19 on the Billboard Top R&B/Hip-Hop Albums chart. It also reached number 92 on Billboard 200 chart on May 3, 1997. "Never Too Busy" cracked the Top 20 of the R&B charts and helped the album reach gold certification. "For You" made an even higher impact, reaching number six on the R&B charts.

"Always Remember" was used in the soundtrack for the movie "Scream".

Track listing

Samples
 "I Won't Let You Down" contains a sample from "Love T.K.O." (1980).

Charts

Weekly charts

Year-end charts

Certifications

References

External links 
 

Kenny Lattimore albums
1996 debut albums